Varnitsy is a rural locality (a village) in Pyatovskoye Rural Settlement, Totemsky District, Vologda Oblast, Russia. The population was 791 as of 2002. There are 16 streets.

Geography 
Varnitsy is located 2 km north of Totma (the district's administrative centre) by road. Pyatovskaya is the nearest rural locality.

References 

Rural localities in Tarnogsky District